Wild Wings is a 1966 British short documentary film directed by Patrick Carey and John Taylor and produced by British Transport Films. In 1967, it won an Oscar for Best Short Subject at the 39th Academy Awards.

Summary
The film looks at the conservation work carried out by The Wildfowl & Wetlands Trust at its headquarters in Slimbridge, Gloucestershire, England.

Cast
 Peter Scott as Narrator (voice)

References

External links

1966 films
1966 documentary films
1966 short films
1960s short documentary films
British short documentary films
Live Action Short Film Academy Award winners
Documentary films about nature
British Transport Films
Films about birds
1960s English-language films
1960s British films